"The Island Hymn" is the patriotic song of the Canadian province of Prince Edward Island.

History
It was first conceived early in 1908 by Professor Harry Watts of the Charlottetown School of Music who, at the suggestion of Rev. Dr. Thomas Fullerton, contacted Islander author and poet Lucy Maud Montgomery asking if she would compose the hymn's lyrics, which she wrote in 1908.

A stanza from the "Hymn" was performed for the first time in public on May 22 of that year at a combined school event marking both Arbor Day and Empire Day. Written to the metre of God Save the King, it was sung to Lawrence W. Watson's music, which had been composed especially for her lyric at the request of Professor Watts. The full piece was not performed until school closing exercises the following June 29th, as Watts recalled, that the "Hymn" was first sung in its entirety. 

The manuscript music, dated October 27, 1908, and correspondence relating to it are displayed at the Green Gables Heritage Place in Cavendish. An edition for mixed-voice choir composed by Christopher Gledhill was printed by Leslie Music Supply for the Prince Edward Island 1973 Centennial Committee.

"The Island Hymn" was official adopted as the provincial anthem by the Legislative Assembly of Prince Edward Island on May 7, 2010. The Provincial Anthem Act also includes a French version called "L’hymne de l’Île", which was translated by Raymond J. Arsenault of Abram-Village.

Lyrics

See also

Anthems and nationalistic songs of Canada

References

Regional songs
Songs about islands
Canadian anthems
Prince Edward Island music
1908 songs